Conrado Walter, S.A.C. (19 June 1923 – 20 September 2018) was a German-born Brazilian prelate of the Roman Catholic Church.

Walter was born in Bichishausen, Germany and was ordained a priest on 2 December 1956 from the Religious order of Society of the Catholic Apostolate. Walter was appointed Auxiliary Bishop of the Diocese of Jacarezinho on 1 December 1977 as well as Titular bishop of Lysinia and ordained on 3 February 1978. Walter was appointed Coadjutor bishop of Jacarezinho on 26 November 1984 and succeeded as bishop on 10 August 1991. Walter retired 5 July 2000. He died in September 2018 at the age of 95.

References

External links
Catholic-Hierarchy

1923 births
2018 deaths
Pallottine bishops
20th-century Roman Catholic bishops in Brazil
21st-century Roman Catholic bishops in Brazil
20th-century German Roman Catholic priests
Roman Catholic bishops of Jacarezinho
Brazilian people of German descent
People from Münsingen, Germany
German emigrants to Brazil